Geoffrey Wade Combe (born February 1, 1956) is an American former professional baseball pitcher.

Career
Combe was signed by the Cincinnati Reds of the Major League Baseball (MLB) as an amateur free agent in 1974.  He made Minor League stops with Eugene, Tampa, Three Rivers, Nashville, and finally Indy before making it to the majors on September 2, 1980.

Combe had a series of solid seasons in the minors, starting with the Nashville Sounds of the Southern League in 1978 where he posted a 12–6 record and a 1.89 ERA in 66 games. His seven-year minor league career amounted to a record of 44–26 with an ERA of 2.31. In 1979 for the Sounds, he broke the league's record for saves with 27. He was rewarded for his efforts with a spot on the Southern League All-Star team.

References

External links

1956 births
Living people
American expatriate baseball players in Canada
Baseball players from Massachusetts
Charleston Charlies players
Cincinnati Reds players
Edmonton Trappers players
Eugene Emeralds players
Indianapolis Indians players
Major League Baseball pitchers
Nashville Sounds players
People from Melrose, Massachusetts
Sportspeople from Middlesex County, Massachusetts
Tampa Tarpons (1957–1987) players
Trois-Rivières Aigles players